Mani Krishnaswami, (also written as Mani Krishnaswamy, 3 February 1930 – 12 July 2002) was a Carnatic music vocalist of Tamil Nadu, India.

Family
Her birth name was Mani Perundevi. Her father, LakshmiNarasimhachari, was the secretary of Vellore Sangeetha Sabha. When Mani was six years of age, her mother Maragathavalli taught her to play violin. Mani's husband Krishnaswamy is an active arts promoter.

Training in Carnatic music
Krishnaswami's first mentor in Carnatic music was a family musician friend named Gopaalachaari. Krishnaswami learned more than 500 songs while still a child.
After completing secondary education, she enrolled for the Sangeeta Siromani course in Kalakshetra at Adayar, Chennai.  At  Kalakshetra she came under the influence of doyens like Rukmini Devi Arundale, Tiger Varadachariar and Papanasam Sivan.

She has the distinction of learning Carnatic music from five giants in the field, who were also recipients of the coveted Sangeetha Kalanidhi award. They are: Mysore Vasudevachar, Budalur Krishnamurthy Saastry, Musiri Subramania Iyer, Tiger Varadaachaariar and Paapanaasam Sivan.

Mani followed the Musiri tradition. She was a key figure in popularizing the works of Musiri Subramania Iyer.

Musical journey

Krishnaswami was chosen by the government of India, and she performed music concerts in the Festival of India held in the then Soviet Union (1989) and in Germany (1991). She has rendered numerous music concerts both within India and in many other countries. She was a visiting faculty at San Francisco University for a short period.

Krishnaswami was the Asthaana Vidhwan at Tirumala Tirupati Devasthanams.

She rendered Desikar's Achuta Satakam in the ancient Prakrit language and set it to music.

A well-known music critic, Subbudu, commended her voice as golden and mellifluous.

Awards

 Sangeetha Choodamani, 1979 by Sri Krishna Gana Sabha
 Kalaimamani, 1991 by Tamil Nadu State Government
 Sangeetha Kalanidhi, 1992 by Madras Music Academy
 Sangeet Natak Akademi Award, 1987 by Sangeet Natak Akademi
 Padma Shri, 2002

Death
Krishnaswami died on Friday, July 12, 2002, at the age of 72 due to cardiac arrest.

References

External links
 Shrimati Mani Krishnaswami profile
 
 Mani Krishnaswami songs

1930 births
2002 deaths
Women Carnatic singers
Sangeetha Kalanidhi recipients
20th-century Indian singers
Recipients of the Padma Shri in arts
20th-century Indian women singers
Carnatic singers
Women musicians from Tamil Nadu
Recipients of the Sangeet Natak Akademi Award